Events in the year 2022 in Israel.

Incumbents
 President of Israel – Isaac Herzog
 Prime Minister of Israel – Naftali Bennett until 30 June; Yair Lapid until 29 December; Benjamin Netanyahu since 29 December
 President of the Supreme Court – Esther Hayut
 Chief of General Staff – Aviv Kochavi
 Government of Israel – Thirty-sixth government of Israel and Thirty-seventh government of Israel

Events

January

 1 January – Two rockets fired from Gaza explode off the coast, one close to Tel Aviv and the second near Palmachim; the Israeli Air Force responds with strikes on Hamas targets in Gaza and tanks fire at Hamas military posts near Gaza's border with Israel.
 2 January – The first stage in a reform of Israel's kosher certification system comes into effect, allowing food retailers and manufacturers to select any religious council in the country to provide them with kashrut supervision, rather than only their local council.
 3 January
 Two Israel Air Force pilots are killed when a Eurocopter AS565 Panther helicopter crashes during a training exercise off the coast near Haifa, while a third crew member survives with moderate injuries.
 A four-year-old child is shot dead by a gunman in Bir al-Maksur.
 5 January – President Isaac Herzog and First Lady, Michal Herzog, receive their fourth dose of the COVID-19 vaccine as a second booster dose vaccination campaign begins in Israel.
 9 January – Israel mostly reopens its borders, closed to tourists since November, and abolishes its "red list" of restricted travel countries, as coronavirus rates rise to record-high levels due to the Omicron variant, making the impact of travel bans negligible.
 13 January – Several days of clashes in the Negev Desert between Bedouin protesters and the police triggered by a forestation project leads to a coalition crisis and the government advancing a comprehensive plan to formalize the status of some unrecognized Bedouin settlements as permanent villages.
 20 January
 The United Nations General Assembly approves by consensus a resolution co-sponsored by Israel and other countries to combat Holocaust denial, on the 80th anniversary of the Wannsee Conference at which Nazi leaders decided on the "final solution to the Jewish question" for the systematic annihilation of European Jewry.
 The Attorney General, Avichai Mandelblit, opens an investigation into claims that the Israel Police used NSO spyware on Israeli's cellphones.
 23 January
 Israel and the United Arab Emirates establish a multimillion-dollar joint research and development fund to support private sector collaboration and investment in the next ten years.
 The government decides to establish a state commission of inquiry into submarine and naval vessel purchases from German shipbuilder ThyssenKrupp for $2 billion that occurred under the government of former prime minister Benjamin Netanyahu for possible corruption and bribery.
 24 January – An earthquake registering slightly more than 4.1 on the Richter scale centered northeast of Beit She'an, south of the Sea of Galilee, is felt throughout the country; no injuries or damage are reported.
 27 January – Storm Elpis blankets the cities Jerusalem and Safed and the mountains of northern and central Israel, with heavy snow. 
 30 January – President Herzog makes the first official visit of an Israeli president to the United Arab Emirates, meets with Emirati government and business leaders, and members of the Jewish community, and opens an Israel national day at Expo 2020 in Dubai.

February

 1 February – Former minister and leader of the Shas Party, Aryeh Deri, is sentenced to a 12-month suspended prison term along with NIS 180,000 fine in a plea deal for tax offences.
 2 February – Defense Minister Benny Gantz visits Bahrain in his first official visit to sign security agreements as the two nations further bolster their ties, and meets top Bahraini officials, including King Hamad bin Isa Al Khalifa.
 4 to 20 February – Six athletes represent Israel at the 2022 Winter Olympics in Beijing, in Figure Skating, Short Track Speed Skating and Alpine Skiing.
 15 February – Prime Minister Bennett meets with King Hamad bin Isa Al Khalifa, senior government officials, businesspeople, and representatives of local Bahraini Jewish community, during the first visit to Bahrain by an Israeli premier, to discuss the development of trade, technology and innovation, and defense ties.
 16 February – The Speaker of the US House of Representatives, Nancy Pelosi, leads a congressional delegation on a visit to Israel and reaffirms the United States' "ironclad" guarantee of Israel's security in the face of threats from Iran posed by its nuclear program and support for terrorist organizations.
 16 February – The Israel Innovation Authority and the Defense Ministry allocate some $62 million to develop the infrastructure for quantum computational ability and ultimately, a quantum computer.
 17 February – Bnei Herzliya win the State Basketball Cup in the final match against Hapoel Tel Aviv with a score of 87–82. 
 24 February – Foreign Minister Yair Lapid condemns the Russian invasion of Ukraine as "a grave violation of the international order" and offers humanitarian assistance to the citizens of Ukraine.
 25 February – 40,000 runners participate in the Tel Aviv Marathon; Vincent Kipsang Rono of Kenya and Bikaya Mantamar of Israel are the men's and women's winners, respectively.
 26 February – Thousands of Israelis rally in Tel Aviv to protest Russia's invasion of Ukraine and to demand that the Israeli government take stronger measures in support of Ukraine.

March

 1 March – The government relaxes almost all health restrictions related to the COVID-19 pandemic; only the rules regarding face masks in indoor public spaces, 'Green Pass' to enter old age homes, and PCR tests upon arrival for Israelis returning from abroad remain in place.
 2 March – The newly elected Chancellor of Germany, Olaf Scholz, makes his first official visit to Israel.
 5 March – Prime Minister Bennett flies to Moscow on Shabbat to meet with President Vladimir Putin regarding the Russian invasion of Ukraine; Bennet also speaks by phone with Ukrainian President Volodymyr Zelenskyy before and after the meeting, and flies to Berlin to meet with Olaf Scholz before returning to Israel.
 9 March – President Herzog meets with the Turkish President, Recep Tayyip Erdoğan in Ankara, in what is perceived to be a renewal of relations between Israel and Turkey, which have been practically frozen since 2010.
 11 March – Sheina Vaspi represents Israel at the 2022 Winter Paralympics in Alpine Skiing; she is the first Israeli athlete ever to compete at the Winter Paralympic Games.
 20 March
 Hundreds of thousands of mourners participate in the funeral procession of Rabbi Chaim Kanievsky in Bnei Brak, in one of the largest funerals in Israel's history.
 Ukrainian President Volodymyr Zelenskyy addresses the Members of Knesset via Zoom, and invoking the memory of the Holocaust, calls on Israel to provide military support to his country in its struggle to resist the Russian invasion; the speech is also broadcast via large screen television, to thousands of protesters in Habima Square in Tel Aviv gathered to show support for Ukraine. 
 22 March – During an attack in Beersheba, four people are killed and two are injured in a stabbing and vehicle-ramming attack by an Islamic State supporter, before he is shot and killed by a civilian passer-by.
 25 March – In the Jerusalem Marathon, Ageze Guadie from Israel and Valentina Versca, a refugee from the war in Ukraine, are the winners of the men's and women's races, respectively.
 27 March
 The Negev Summit takes place in Sde Boker, a conference between Israeli authorities and representatives of Egypt, Bahrain, Morocco and the United Arab Emirates. US Secretary of State Antony Blinken also attends the conference.
 Two Islamic State gunmen kill two people and wound two others in Hadera before they are shot and killed by security forces.
 29 March – A Palestinian kills five people in a mass shooting in Bnei Brak, Tel Aviv District.

April 

 1 April – Israel and the United Arab Emirates conclude negotiations for a free trade agreement, which will make 95 percent of traded products between the two countries customs-free and will include food, agricultural and cosmetic products, and medicines and medical equipment.
 4 April – Foreign Minister Yair Lapid expresses horror over the mass civilian casualties in areas of Ukraine where Russian troops have withdrawn, including the Bucha massacre, and condemns them as a war crime.
 6 April – MK Idit Silman, the governing coalition's parliamentary whip, resigns her position and withdraws her support for the government, leaving the Knesset split evenly between the coalition and opposition, and the government vulnerable to a vote of no-confidence that could bring it down.
 7 April – A Palestinian gunman kills three people and injures nine others, in a mass shooting in Dizengoff Street, Tel Aviv; the attacker is later killed in a shootout with police.
 10 April – The Supreme Court rules in favor of plaintiffs whose family members were killed in terror attacks during the Second Intifada that the Palestinian Authority can be held liable for attacks, due to its policy of paying stipends to convicted terrorists in Israeli jails and to the families of those killed during attacks on Israelis.
 11 April – Palestinian gunmen shoot and wound two Hasidic Jews trying to visit Joseph's Tomb, a shrine sacred to all three Abrahamic faiths in the city of Nablus, a day after it was vandalized and set on fire by a group of about a hundred Palestinian rioters before they were dispersed by Palestinian security forces. 
 15 April – Israeli police raid the Al-Aqsa Mosque during riots on the Temple Mount in Jerusalem, during which Palestinians inside the mosque threw objects and explosive devices at police; over 150 Palestinians and three policemen are injured in the clashes.
 18 April – Israeli astronaut Eytan Stibbe, holds the first Passover Seder in space on the first night of the holiday, during his participation in the first privately funded and operated trip to the International Space Station to conduct science and technology experiments for a number of universities and startups in Israel.
 29 April to 1 May – Israeli judokas win four medals at the 2022 European Judo Championships, Timna Nelson-Levy winning the gold in the 57-kilogram weight category, and Raz Hershko winning a silver and Shira Rishony and Gili Sharir each winning a bronze in their respective classes.
30 April – An Israeli security guard stationed at a security booth is killed while protecting his fiancée in a shooting attack at the entrance to Ariel; two Palestinian gunmen are captured later by Israeli security forces.

May 

 5 May
 The International Bible Contest takes place in Jerusalem on Independence Day; Hillel Cohen and Dvir Haim Martzbach jointly win first place.
 Three people are killed in a stabbing and axing attack, and three are severely injured by two Palestinian terrorists, in El'ad, Central District.
 11 May – Al Jazeera journalist, Shireen Abu Akleh is shot and killed while covering an Israel Defense Forces raid on the West Bank city of Jenin.
 12 May – Michael Ben David represents Israel in the Eurovision Song Contest in Turin, Italy.
 16 May – Maccabi Haifa wins the Israeli Premier League in Association football for the second time in a row,  by attaining an insurmountable lead in points that other contenders cannot overcome in the final round.
 19 May – MK Ghaida Rinawie Zoabi, of the Meretz party, resigns from the coalition, reducing it to a minority in the Knesset.
 24 May – Hapoel Be'er Sheva wins the 2021–22 Israel State Cup in association football at Teddy Stadium in Jerusalem, defeating Maccabi Haifa 3–1 on penalties after a 2–2 draw.

June

13 June – European Union leader Ursula von der Leyen, and Italian Prime Minister Mario Draghi visit Israel for talks focused on increased energy cooperation, especially the export of Israeli natural gas to Europe.
 15 June – the Energy Ministers of Egypt, Israel and the European Union sign an agreement in Cairo to increase natural-gas sales to European countries seeking alternative sources to lessen their dependence on Russian energy supplies.
 20 June – Prime Minister Bennett and Alternate Prime Minister Yair Lapid announce that have decided to dissolve the coalition and submit a bill to dissolve the Knesset, leading to a fifth election in less than four years; Lapid will become the caretaker prime minister until a new government is formed.
 21 June – In response to recent terrorist attacks, Israel begins reinforcing a section of the northern part of its West Bank security barrier with a concrete wall.
 29 June – Albert Bourla, CEO of Pfizer, is presented the Genesis Prize by President Isaac Herzog in Jerusalem for his leadership in delivering a vaccine against COVID-19.
 30 June – The Knesset approves a bill to disband itself and schedules new elections for 1 November; Foreign Minister and Alternate Prime Minister Yair Lapid succeeds Naftali Bennett as Prime Minister until a new coalition is formed.

July

 2 July − Hezbollah launches three drones from Lebanon at an Israeli vessel operating in the Karish gas field off Israel's coast, which are all downed by the Israeli Airforce; Lebanon and Israel are engaged in US-mediated negotiations to delineate a shared maritime border.
 4 to 7 July – Young athletes from 47 countries compete in the 2022 European Athletics U18 Championships held in Jerusalem at the Hebrew University Stadium.
 7 to 17 July – Israeli athletes compete in ten sports at the 2022 World Games in Birmingham, United States, winning seven gold, three silver and four bronze medals, and attaining eleventh place overall at the Games.
 12–13 July − Daria Atamanov wins two gold medals and a silver for Israel in rhythmic gymnastics at the World Games.
 10 July – Doron Almog is appointed Chairman of the Jewish Agency for Israel.
 14 July to 15 July – State visit of US President Joe Biden to Israel
 14 July  –  The United States and Israel agree on the extension of a 10-year,  $38 billion US defense package to Israel and commit to preventing Iran from obtaining a nuclear weapon. 
 15 July – President Biden and Prime Minister Lapid attend the first meeting of I2U2 forum, together with the President of the United Arab Emirates, Mohammed bin Zayed Al Nahyan, and the Prime Minister of India, Narendra Modi, in a virtual conference during which the four countries agreed to collaborate further on issues including food security, clean energy, technology and trade, and reaffirm their support for the Abraham Accords.
14 to 26 July − The 21st Maccabiah Games 
 14 July – The opening ceremony of the 21st Maccabiah Games are held at Teddy Stadium in Jerusalem, with US President Biden, and Israeli President Herzog and Prime Minister Lapid amongst the 30,000 dignitaries and spectators in attendance.

August 

 1 August – Kobi Shabtai makes the first official visit to Morocco of an Israel Police Commissioner to meet with senior Moroccan police and government officials for discussions regarding strengthening operational, intelligence, and investigative cooperation between the two countries.
 5–7 August – Israel launches Operation Breaking Dawn in response to threats from Palestinian Islamic Jihad with airstrikes against the Gaza Strip, killing Islamic Jihad leader Tayseer Jabari and other high ranking PIJ commanders; Islamic Jihad fires about 1,000 rockets into Israel from Gaza, with 96 percent intercepted by Israel's air defenses and about 160 falling short within Gaza.
 15 August – At the European Championships in  Munich, Israel's men's marathon team wins the gold medal, Ethiopian-born Israeli runners Marhu Teferi and Gashau Ayale win a silver and bronze medal, respectively in the individual marathon, and Kenyan-born Israeli runner Lonah Chemtai Salpeter wins Israel's fourth medal, taking bronze in the 10,000-meter run and setting an Israeli record.
 16 August – Anastasia Gorbenko wins the gold medal for Israel in the 200-meter individual medley at the European Aquatics Championships in Rome, for a second consecutive year.
 18 August – Israel and Turkey announce the resumption of full diplomatic relations, with the exchange of ambassadors for the first time since 2018.
 21 August – Artem Dolgopyat wins the Floor gold medal at the European Artistic Gymnastics Championship in Munich.
 22 August – The Bank of Israel raises its benchmark interest rate from 1.25% to 2.0%, the largest increase in two decades, in an effort to curb inflation, which has exceeded 5% over the past year.

September

 2 September – The German government confirms that the families of the Israeli athletes killed at the 1972 Munich Olympics will receive a total of $28 million in compensation and agrees to acknowledge the failures that authorities made at the time.
 4–6 September – President Isaac Herzog and First Lady Michal Herzog pay a state visit to Germany to participate in the 50th anniversary memorial for the 1972 Munich Olympics massacre;  President Herzog meets with German President Frank-Walter Steinmeier, Chancellor Olaf Scholz and other senior officials, addresses the Bundestag and visits the Bergen-Belsen concentration camp.
 12–16 September – Delegations from 25 countries, including Chiefs of Staff and commanders from militaries from around the world, attend the first International Operational Innovation Conference; for the first time, an Arab military head, Lieutenant General Belkhir El-Farouk, Inspector General of the Royal Moroccan Armed Forces makes an official visit to Israel.
 17 September – a large sinkhole opens on the Ayalon Highway in Tel Aviv,  disrupting traffic for thousands of commuters and prompting the closure of several lanes and a nearby exit, but resulting in no injuries or accidents despite occurring on one of Israel's busiest traffic arteries.

October
 26 October – President Isaac Herzog begins an official visit to the United States.
 27 October – Representatives of Israel and Lebanon sign a U.S.-brokered agreement that establishes a maritime boundary and ends a dispute over the maritime border between the two countries, opening the way for each to exploit the natural resources of the area.

November

 1 November – Elections for the 25th Knesset take place and a right-wing bloc of political parties lead by former Prime Minister Benjamin Netanyahu wins a majority needed to form a government.
 7 November – Addressing world leaders at the UN COP27 climate conference in Sharm el-Sheikh, President Herzog warns of imminent climate catastrophe for Middle East and urges regional cooperation to avert disaster.
 13 November – After consulting with representatives of the parties who have won seats in the 25th Knesset, President Isaac Herzog officially grants the mandate to form Israel's 37th government to Likud leader Benjamin Netanyahu.
 15 November –
 A Palestinian kills three Israelis and wounds three others in a  vehicle-ramming and stabbing attack in the Ariel settlement.
 The swearing-in ceremony for the newly elected members of the 25th Knesset is held.
 16 November – A plaza in Jerusalem's Kiryat Ha'Yovel neighborhood is named in honor of Aristides de Sousa Mendes, a Portuguese diplomat who saved thousands of Jews during the Holocaust.
 23 November

 In a coordinated double terror attack, remotely detonated bombs explode at two bus stops in Jerusalem, resulting in 23 injuries and the death of a 16-year-old Israeli-Canadian student studying at a Jewish religious school.
A 17-year old Israeli Druze student, Tiran Fero dies following a car accident and his body is held hostage by a faction of the Palestinian Islamic Jihad until pressure by Israel, the Druze community and other countries results in his return.

December

 9 December – David Tiacho wins the men's race in the Tiberias Marathon with a personal best time of 2:13:00 and Beatie Deutsch wins the women's race for the fourth time in 2:41:20.
 29 December – The thirty-seventh government of Israel is sworn in at the Knesset, with Benjamin Netanyahu becoming Prime Minister again as the head of a far-right coalition.
 30 December – The Central Bureau of Statistics releases data showing that 9.656 million million people live in Israel at the end of 2022, of whom 7.106 million (74%) are Jewish, 2.037 million (21%) are Arab and 513,000 (5%) are other groups; 2,675,000 foreign tourists visited and 70,000 people from 95 different countries immigrated to Israel in 2022.

Deaths

 1 January –  (b. 1928), clinical psychologist, professor of Psychology, director of the Henrietta Szold Institute, social issues advisor to Prime Ministers Golda Meir and Yitzhak Rabin.
 2 January – Yitzhak Kaul (b. 1945), Deputy Director General of the Ministry of Communications (1976–1986), businessman, CEO of Israel Postal Authority (1986–1990), Bezeq (1990–1997), and Clal investment company (1997–2000).
 2 January – Suzanne Singer (b. 1935), contributor and editor of Moment magazine and the Biblical Archaeology Review, director of the Alex Singer Project.
 3 January – Mordechai Ben-Porat (b. 1923), organizer of Operation Ezra and Nehemiah rescue of Iraqi Jews, Member of Knesset 1965–1977 and 1981–1984, Minister without Portfolio 1982–1984, and recipient of the Israel Prize in 2001.
 6 January – Yoram Taharlev (b. 1938), songwriter, poet and author.
 10 January – Aura Herzog (b. 1924), First Lady of Israel (1983–1993) during the presidency of her husband Chaim Herzog, mother of the current president, Isaac Herzog, social and environmental activist, and founder of the Council for a Beautiful Israel.
 12 January – Meier Schwarz (b. 1926), plant physiologist, lecturer and academic, head of the Hydroponics department at the Jacob Blaustein Institute for Desert Research in Beer Sheva.
 16 January – Tova Berlinski (b. 1915), artist, notably of the Holocaust and her hometown Oświęcim, Poland, recipient of the Jerusalem Prize (1963) and the Mordechai Ish-Shalom Award (2000).
 18 January – Eliezer Schweid (b. 1929), philosopher, scholar, writer and professor of Jewish philosophy at the Hebrew University of Jerusalem, fellow of the Jerusalem Center for Public Affairs and Israel Prize recipient (1994).
 19 January – Yevgeny Aryeh (b. 1947), playwright, theater director, and founder of the Gesher Theater in Jaffa. 
 21 January – Haim Shahal (b. 1922), naval engineer, member of the Palmach and the Israel Defense Forces, recipient of the Israel Prize (1973). 
 24 January – Miriam Naor (b. 1947), District and Supreme Court judge, Chief Justice of the Supreme Court (2015 – 2017).
 25 January – Mark Tseitlin (b. 1943), chess International Master (1978) and Grandmaster (1997).
 26 January – David Bannett (b. 1921), electronics engineer, radar technologies pioneer, inventor of the Shabbat elevator, lecturer in electronics at Bar Ilan University and the Jerusalem College of Technology.
 31 January – Esther Pollard (b. 1953), wife of former spy Jonathan Pollard.
 10 February –  (b. 1994), power forward player in the Israeli Basketball Premier League 2018–2021.
 13 February – Emanuel Marx (b. 1927), social anthropologist, Professor Emeritus in the Department of Sociology and Anthropology at Tel Aviv University and recipient of the Israel Prize (1998).
 13 February –  (b. 1935), writer, poet and translator into Russian.
 15 February – Nachman Wolf (b. 1951), world champion discus thrower, shot put and javelin medalist for Israel at the Paralympics (1984 and 1988).
 18 February – Gabriel Bach (b. 1927), State Attorney, one of the prosecutors in the Eichmann trial, jurist, Supreme Court Justice (1982–1997).
 21 February – Nava Arad (b. 1938), Alignment and Labor Party politician, Member of Knesset (1981–1992, 1995–1996).
 23 February – Yoel Marcus (b. 1932), journalist and political commentator, Sokolov Prize recipient (2017). 
 1 March – Amnon Shamosh (1929), non-fiction author and poet, recipient of the President's Prize for Literature in 2001.
 2 March – Yosef Carmon (b. 1933), film actor, and actor and director at the Cameri Theater for over 50 years.
 3 March – Yona Fischer (b. 1932), Israeli art curator and critic, recipient of the Israel Prize for design (1977).
 7 March – Avraham Hirschson (b. 1941), Likud and Kadima Member of Knesset, Minister of Tourism, Communications and Finance; director general of the Treasury, convicted of embezzlement (2009).
12 March – Eliezer Goldberg (b. 1931), jurist, Supreme Court Justice (1983–1998) and state comptroller (1998–2005).
 12 March – Henry Herscovici (b. 1927), sports shooter at the 1968 and 1972 Summer Olympics, the Asian Games (1966, 1970, and 1974) and the Maccabiah Games (1965, 1969).
 17 March – David Schmeidler (b. 1939), mathematician and economic theorist in the field of Game Theory and Decision Theory, Professor Emeritus at Tel Aviv University and the Ohio State University.
 18 March – Chaim Kanievsky (b. 1928), Haredi rabbi, a major halachic authority and author of books on Jewish religious law.
 4 April –  (b. 1951), industrialist and businessman.
 8 April – Barak Lufan (b. 1987), kayaker and the head of the Israel Canoe Association.
 1 May – Naftali Blumenthal (b. 1922), politician, MK for the Labor Alignment (1981–1984), comptroller of the Histadrut.
 1 May – Ilan Gilon (b. 1956), politician, MK for the Meretz party (1999–2003 and 2009–2021).
 13 May – Uri Savir (b. 1953), politician, MK (1999–2001) and diplomat.
 19 May –  (b. 1927), author, reporter and diplomat.
 27 May – Michael Sela (b. 1924), professor of Immunology, sixth president of the Weizmann Institute of Science and recipient of the Israel Prize for Life Science (1959).
 27 May – Shulamit Goldstein (b. 1968), rhythmic gymnast at the 1988 Olympics, and 1985 and 1987 World Championships.
 2 June – Uri Zohar (b. 1935), entertainer, actor and film director (Hole in the Moon, Three Days and a Child, Bloomfield), and rabbi. 
 9 June – Dan Goldstein (b.1954), software entrepreneur and businessman, founder of Formula Systems.
 14 June – A. B. Yehoshua (b. 1936), novelist (The Lover, A Late Divorce), essayist and playwright, recipient of the Israel Prize for Hebrew literature (1995) and multiple literary awards.
 29 June – Yehuda Meshi Zahav (b. 1955), social activist, founder of ZAKA.
 29 June – David Weiss Halivni (b. 1927), rabbi, Talmudic scholar and teacher, recipient of the Israel Prize for scholarship (2008) and other awards.
18 July – Maya Attoun (b. 1974), award-winning multi-disciplinary visual artist, teacher at Bezalel Academy of Arts and Design and Shenkar College of Engineering, Design and Art.
24 July – Tamar Eshel (b. 1920), diplomat, deputy mayor of Jerusalem,  MK for the Alignment (1977–1984).
 26 July – Uri Orlev (b. 1931), Holocaust survivor, children's author and translator, recipient of the Hans Christian Andersen Award (1996).
 29 July – Yitzchok Tuvia Weiss (b. 1926), ultra-Orthodox rabbi, head of the Edah HaChareidis in Jerusalem.
12 August – Aharon Yadlin (b. 1926), educator and politician, member of the Knesset for Mapai, the Alignment and the Labor Party (1960–1979), Deputy Minister of Education (1964–1972) and Minister of Education (1974–1977).
14 August – Svika Pick (b. 1949), pop singer, songwriter, composer and television personality.
22 August – Shalom Cohen (b.1930), ultra-Orthodox Sephardi rabbi, rosh yeshiva of the Old City branch of Porat Yosef Yeshiva, spiritual leader of the Shas political party and president of Moetzet Chachmei HaTorah.
 8 September – Yoel Schwartz (b.1939), Haredi rabbi, scholar, author and senior lecturer at Dvar Yerushalayim yeshiva. 
 18 September – Elyakim Haetzni (b.1926), lawyer, settlement activist, politician and member of the Knesset for Tehiya (1990–1992).
 7 October – Shoshana Netanyahu (b. 1923), lawyer, jurist and Supreme Court justice.
10 October – Leon Schidlowsky (b. 1931), composer for orchestra, chamber ensemble, choir, and various musical instruments, proponent of graphic notation. 
 19 October – Dina Merhav (b. 1936), sculptor, noted for soaring sculptures of birds and angels made from scrap iron.
 28 October – Hannah Pick-Goslar (b. 1928), nurse, Holocaust survivor and childhood friend and fellow prisoner in Bergen-Belsen of Anne Frank.
 29 October – Hava Pinhas-Cohen (b. 1955) award-winning writer and poet, founder and editor of the Dimui literary journal.
 1 November – Moshe Ha-Elion (b. 1925), Holocaust survivor, Ladino author and translator.
 3 November – Uzzi Ornan (b. 1923),  social activist and linguist, member of the Academy of the Hebrew Language, professor of natural languages computing at the Technion and professor emeritus at the Hebrew University of Jerusalem. 
 6 November – Chaim Walkin (b. 1945), Orthodox rabbi, teacher and dean of the Ateres Israel rabbinical academy and yeshiva.
 21 November – Nuzhat Katzav (b. 1932), author and politician, member of Knesset for the Alignment (1974–1977).
 8 December – Yitzhak Klepter (b. 1950), rock musician and songwriter, vocalist and electric guitarist of the Kaveret rock band.
 11 December – Moshe Mizrahi (b. 1950), Head of Israel Police Investigations Division (2001–2005) and Police and Community Branch-Civil Guard (2005–2006), member of Knesset for the Labor Party (2013–2015) and Zionist Union (2018–2019).
 15 December – Eliyahu Offer (b. 1944), football player for Hapoel Be'er Sheva (1959–1978), manager (Beitar Jerusalem, Maccabi Sha'arayim), and restauranteur. 
 22 December Ze'ev Iviansky (b. 1922) political scientist, author, academic and lecturer at the Hebrew University of Jerusalem.
 23 December – Willie Sims (b. 1958), basketball player (Hapoel Tel Aviv, Elitzur Netanya, Maccabi Tel Aviv).
25 December – Haim Drukman (b. 1932), Orthodox rabbi and politician, member of Knesset (1977–1983, 1999–2003), a spiritual leader of the Religious Zionist community, Rosh Yeshiva of Yeshivat Or Etzion, and head of the Center for Bnei Akiva Yeshivot.  
30 December – Shmuel Toledano (b. 1921),  Mossad intelligence officer and politician, member of the Knesset for the Democratic Movement for Change and Shinui (1977–1981).

See also

 COVID-19 pandemic in Israel
 Israel at the 2022 Winter Olympics
 Timeline of the Israeli–Palestinian conflict in 2022

References

 
Israel
Israel
2020s in Israel
Years of the 21st century in Israel